Chi Peng (born 1981) is a Chinese-born artist who lives and works in Beijing, China.

Born in Yantai, Shandong Province, China in 1981, he entered the Central Academy of Fine Arts (CAFA) in 2001, and graduated from the Digital Media Department, Central Academy of Fine Arts (CAFA) in 2005.

Biography
Chi Peng graduated from the Central Academy of Fine Art in Beijing, with Photography as his main subject, in 2005. During his study he was selected by curator Feng Boyi, who is also co-curator of this exhibition, for an exhibition abroad. Three years later, Chi Peng is one of the most-requested Chinese artists for photographic exhibitions all over the world.

Solo exhibitions

2012

Trading Pain 2012, Ludwig Museum, Budapest, Hungary
Chi Peng | Mood and Memory, Street Level Photoworks, Glasgow, Scotland

2011

Me, Myself, and I, Photoworks 2003–2010, Groninger Museum, Groningen, Netherlands

Mood and Memory,  M97 Gallery, Shang Hai, China

2010

Chi Peng / Mood Is Hard to Remember, Today Art Museum, Beijing, China

Chi Peng / Mood Is Never Better Than Memory, White Space Beijing, Beijing, China

Chi Peng / Mood Is Never Better Than Memory, Art Seasons, Singapore

Chi Peng / Mood Is Never Better Than Memory, Kiang Gallery, Atlanta, US

2009

Secluded Radius—An Exhibition of Works by Chi Peng (2003-2008), He Xiangning Art Museum, Shenzhen, China

Paranomia, Diesel Denim Gallery, Tokyo, Japan

2008

Catcher / Chi Peng, White Space Beijing, Beijing, China

Catcher / Chi Peng, Art Seasons, Singapore

My Monkey King, Lin & Keng Gallery, Taipei, Taiwan

2007

Trading Pain, Ludwig Museum, Budapest, Hungary

Chi Peng: The Monkey King, Alexander Ochs Galleries Berlin | Beijing, Berlin, Germany

Chi Peng’s Journey to the West, White Space Beijing, Beijing, China

Chi Peng / Journey to the West, Olsson Gallery, Stockholm, Sweden

2006

Physical Practice, Zhu Qizhan Museum, Shanghai, China

Games of Simulation, Art Seasons, Singapore

Chi Peng: Up, White Space Beijing, Beijing, China

2005

Naked Lunch, Chambers of Fine Art, New York, US

Group exhibitions

2013

Alles unter dem Himmel gehört allen – China Public Art Exhibition, Kassel, Germany

Secret Love, National Museums of World Culture, Gothenburg, Sweden

2012

CAFAM Future Exhibition-Sub-phenomenon, CAFA Art Museum, Beijing, China

Passing Through Memory  – Suzhou Jinji Lake Art Museum Opening Exhibition, Suzhou Jinji Lake Art 
Museum, Suzhou, China

Secret Love, Museum of Far Eastern Antiquities, Stockholm, Sweden

2011

One Man Theater – Works by Post – 80s Artists, He Xiangning Art Museum, Shenzhen, China

2010

Brave New Worlds, Kongo & China, Theater der Welt, Ruhr, Germany

Mind Effects, White Space Beijing, Beijing, China

Never Equal Distance To The Moon, Beijing, China

Asia Spectrum, Daegu Photo Biennale

2010

Daegu Culture and Arts Center, Daegu, Korea

Big Draft Shanghai—Contemporary Art from the Sigg Collection, Museum of Fine Arts Bern, Bern, 
Switzerland

2009

Then and Now—an exhibition celebrating the 20th anniversary of the Center show, the Center, New 
York,  US

The State of Things—Brussels/Beijing, Palais des Beaux-Arts, Brussels, Belgium

Metropolis Now!—A Selection of Chinese Contemporary Art, Meridian International Center, 
Washington D.C., US

Never equal distance to the moon. power, politics, and the environment, Copenhagen, Denmark

New Acquisitions - Rarely Seen Works, Ludwig Museum - Museum of Contemporary Art, Budapest, 
Hungary

The Third Guangzhou International Photo Biennale, Guangdong Museum of Art, Guangzhou, China

2008

Prague Triennale 2008, National Gallery, Prague, Czech Republic

Just Different, Cobra Museum of Modern Art, Amsterdam, Netherlands

Between Memory & History: From the Epic to the Everyday, The Museum of Contemporary Canadian Art, 
Toronto, Canada

Butterfly Dream—Shanghai MOCA Envisage II, Shanghai MOCA, Shanghai, China

New World Order. Present-day Chinese Installation Art and Photography, Groninger Museum, 
Groningen, Netherlands

Body Language: Contemporary Chinese Photography, National Gallery of Victoria, Melbourne, 
Australia

2007

China Now, Cobra Museum of Modern Art, Amsterdam, Netherlands

Floating: New Generation of Art in China, The National Museum of Contemporary Art, Seoul, Korea

Collective Identity, HK University Museum, Hong Kong, China

View Beyond the Window: Contemporary Art Exhibition, New Generation Art Festival, St. Philips 
Chambers, Birmingham, England

Arrogance & Romance, Ordos Art Museum, Ordos, China

Switcher Sex: Video Works and Photography from the Teutloff Collection, Slought Foundation, 
Philadelphia, US

2006

China Now—Kunst in Zeiten des Umbruchs, Sammlung Essl | Essl Collection, Klosterneuburg, Austria

Signes D’Existence / Signs of Existence, Museum of the Central Academy of Fine Arts, Beijing, 
China

Bitmap, International Digital Photo Project, Seoul, Korea

2005

Karlsruhe Barcelona Cambridge Toronto, Centre Georges-Pompidou, Paris, France

The Second Reality: Photographs from China, Piazza, Brussels, Belgium

The Third Fukuoka Asian Art Triennial, Fukuoka, Japan

About Beauty / Über Schönheit, Haus der Kulturen der Welt, Berlin, Germany

Body Temperature: Invoking the Legacy of Hans Christian Andersen Through Chinese Contemporary 
Art, Nordjyllands Kunstmuseum, Aalborg, Denmark

Body Temperature: Invoking the Legacy of Hans Christian Andersen Through Chinese Contemporary 
Art, Beijing Millennium Art Museum, Beijing, China

920 Kilograms, Duolun Museum of Modern Art, Shanghai, China

2004

One to One: Visions—Recent Photographs from China, Chambers of Fine Art, New York, US

References

External links

1981 births
Chinese photographers
Living people
Artists from Yantai
Central Academy of Fine Arts alumni
Chinese contemporary artists